Van Lear Rose is the forty-second solo studio album by American country music singer-songwriter Loretta Lynn. It was released on April 27, 2004, by Interscope Records. The album was produced by Jack White. The album was widely praised by critics, peaking at No. 2 on the US Billboard Top Country Albums chart and at No. 24 on the Billboard 200, the most successful crossover album of Lynn's 60-year career at that point. The track "Portland Oregon" was listed as the 305th best song of the 2000s by Pitchfork Media.

Background
The album was initially intended as a musical experiment, blending the styles of Lynn and producer White. White also co-wrote one track, sings a duet with Lynn, and performs throughout the entire album as a musician. At the time of the album's release, Lynn was 72 and White was 28. The title refers to Lynn's origins as the daughter of a miner working the Van Lear coal mines.

Critical reception

The album was released to glowing reviews and universal acclaim.  It received a rating of 97 at Metacritic, the fourth highest score ever and the second-highest for a female to date. Blender magazine called the album "Some of the most gripping singing you're going to hear all year .... A brave, unrepeatable record that speaks to her whole life." Stephen Thomas Erlewine of AllMusic said that "The brilliance of Van Lear Rose is not just how the two approaches complement each other, but how the record captures the essence of Loretta Lynn's music even as it has flourishes that are distinctly Jack." Rhapsody ranked the album No. 16 on its "Country’s Best Albums of the Decade" list.

Commercial performance
The album debuted at No. 2 on the US Billboard Top Country Albums chart, and No. 24 on the US Billboard 200, selling 37,000 in its first week, the best sales week for Lynn in the Nielsen Soundscan era. It has sold over 233,000 copies in United States as of September 2004.

The album's first single, "Miss Being Mrs.", was released in April 2004 and did not chart. Its music video premiered on May 23. The second single, "Portland Oregon", was released in May and did not chart. Two music videos were shot for the single, the first one was filmed on May 18 and was not released. The second version premiered the week of October 25.

Accolades

Grammy Awards

|-
|rowspan="5"|2005
|Van Lear Rose
|Best Country Album
|
|-
|rowspan="2"|"Portland Oregon"
|Best Country Collaboration with Vocals
|
|-
|Best Country Song
|
|-
|rowspan="2"|"Miss Being Mrs."
|Best Country Song
|
|-
|Best Female Country Vocal Performance
|
|}

Best-of lists

Track listing

Personnel
Loretta Lynn - lead vocals, acoustic guitar
David Feeny - pedal steel guitar, Dobro, percussion, backing vocals
Patrick Keeler - drums, percussion, backing vocals
"Little" Jack Lawrence - bass guitar, percussion, backing vocals
Dan John Miller - acoustic guitar, percussion, backing vocals
Dirk Powell - fiddle, bowed bass, banjo
Jack White - electric guitar, acoustic guitar, organ, piano, percussion, backing vocals, duet vocals on "Portland Oregon"
Technical
Brendan Benson - engineer
Eric McConnell - engineer
Stuart Sikes - mixing
Russ Harrington - photography

Charts

Weekly charts

Year-end charts

References

External links

2004 albums
Interscope Records albums
Loretta Lynn albums
Albums produced by Jack White
Third Man Records albums
Grammy Award for Best Country Album